STK35L1 is a protein that in humans is encoded by the STK35 (serine/threonine kinase 35) gene.
It is a member of the NKF4 (New Kinase Family 4) Ser/Thr kinases (STK) family and classified in group "Other" in the human kinome.
Previously, STK35L1 was named as Clik1 (CLP36 Interacting Kinase 1) based on a study that showed an association of STK35 with CLP36 after overexpression of both proteins in osteosarcoma cells. Clik1 gene described by Vallenius et al. code for a protein of 501 amino acids. Later, Goyal et al. found that coding sequence of the STK35 gene is incomplete. The newly identified sequence of the STK35 gene codes for a protein of 534 amino acids with a N-terminal elongation of 133 amino acids. It has been designated as STK35L1.

Functions
STK35L1 is predominantly found in the nucleus and the nucleolus.  Nuclear actin was identified as a novel binding partner of STK35L1. However, it can interact with PDLIM1/CLP-36 in the cytoplasm and localize to actin stress fibers. STK35L1 regulates the expression of  CDKN2A and inhibiting G1- to S-phase transition. Depletion of STK35L1 by siRNA impaired endothelial cell migration. STK35L1 may act as a central kinase linking the cell cycle and migration of endothelial cells.

References

Further reading